Controller-free motion control is a specific type of video game which requires no actual controller, executing game play solely on the user's movement. Unlike the Nintendo Wii or Sony PlayStation Move, no controller is held. Instead, hardware - including a camera of some type - utilizes software which takes the video of the user's movements and converts the action into game play controls simultaneously.

At present, Microsoft is the largest company to have brought this technology to the market with the Kinect system (formerly known as Project Natal).

External links 

 Microsoft Xbox Kinect 

Computing input devices